4CHOSEN: The Documentary is a 2008 documentary film narrated by Montel Williams. It was written and directed by Jon Doscher, and produced by Doscher and Fran Ganguzza.

The film is about the aftermath of an incident that occurred April 23, 1998, on the New Jersey Turnpike. Four young men (Danny Reyes, Keshon Moore, Rayshawn Brown, and Jarmaine Grant) from New York City were traveling on the turnpike on their way to a basketball talent showcase in North Carolina when they were pulled over by two state troopers and shot at thirteen times. Three of the young men were seriously injured, and the incident sparked conversations about Police brutality as well as Racial profiling.

Summary 
The film documents the court proceedings and the investigation of the New Jersey State Police.  The four basketball players were represented by attorney David Ironman, and supported by Reverend Al Sharpton and Johnnie Cochran in a case that became known as "one of the largest racial profiling cases in American history".

Reception 
The film opened the 2008 Garden State Film Festival where the film won Best Documentary – Short. The film premiered at the Paramount Theater in Asbury Park.

Jon Doscher promoted the film on various outlets, including The Montel Williams Show and Quite Frankly with Stephen A. Smith.

References

External links 
Official website

2008 films
Works about police brutality
American documentary films
Documentary films about African Americans
New Jersey Turnpike
Race and law in the United States
2008 documentary films
Documentary films about racism in the United States
Films shot in New Jersey
Film producers from New Jersey
2000s English-language films
2000s American films